Charles John Ayton (24 February 1846 – 29 July 1922) was a New Zealand goldminer, rabbiter, rural labourer and diarist. He was born in Newcastle upon Tyne, Northumberland, England, on 24 February 1846.

References

1846 births
1922 deaths
New Zealand miners
English emigrants to New Zealand
New Zealand diarists